The Bells is an album by German pianist and composer Nils Frahm which was first released in 2009 on the Swedish Kning Disk label then more broadly released in 2010 on the Erased Tapes label. It was recorded over 2 days in the Grunewald Church in Berlin.

Reception

The Bells received mainly positive reviews on release. At Metacritic, which assigns a normalised rating out of 100 to reviews from mainstream critics, the album has received a score of 75, based on 6 reviews which is categorised as generally favorable. Writing for BBC Music, Spencer Grady observed "The resultant pieces feel so alive that you can almost sense the pressure of Frahm’s fingers alighting on each key as these solemn improvisations begin to weave their magic. Their unrefined organic energy and resonance is undoubtedly due to the natural reverb of the old church in Berlin where this set was recorded". Rock Sound reviewer Joe Marshall enthused "The Bells is a consistently fascinating listen. Possessing a grandeur that never descends into pomposity and a restraint that could never be mistaken for bland aural wallpaper, this is undoubtedly one of the most beautiful releases you’re likely to hear over the coming months'. Not all critics were as generous. In his 3 star review on MusicOMH, Ben Hogwood said "The Bells is a mixed bag of accomplished piano pieces that could do with a bit more subtlety in those passages where the intensity rises. It’s those softer, more intimate asides that have the greatest impact, allowing the listener to truly connect with Nils Frahm and his message. And that’s where the simple beauty of the piano shines through". In his review for Pitchfork, Brian Howe gave the album 4.8 out of 10 saying "The bottom line is that The Bells tends to be either tedious and pretty or interesting and caustic; it often feels unpleasantly satisfied with itself.".

Track listing

Personnel
Nils Frahm - piano
Peter Broderick - musical direction

References

Nils Frahm albums
Erased Tapes Records albums
2010 albums